The Windsor Charity Classic was a golf tournament on the Canadian Tour. It was played from 1979 to 1991 and was revived again for the 2012 season.

Winners
Jamieson WFCU Windsor Roseland Charity Classic
2012  Alan McLean

Windsor Charity Classic
1992–2011 No tournament
1991  John Erickson
1990  Dave DeLong
1989  Jerry Anderson
1988  Matt Cole
1987  Daniel Talbot
1986  David Tentis
1985  Sandy Harper
1984  Ken Tarling
1983 No tournament
1982  Erin Ray Fostey
1981  Bob Beauchemin
1980  Bob Eastwood
1979  Bob Eastwood

External links

Coverage on the Canadian Tour's official site

Golf tournaments in Ontario
Former PGA Tour Canada events